Ashley Michele Greene Khoury (born February 21, 1987) is an American actress. She is known for playing Alice Cullen in the film adaptations of Stephenie Meyer's Twilight novels.

Early life 
Greene was born on February 21, 1987, in Jacksonville, Florida, the younger of two children of Michele, who works for an insurance company, and Joe Greene Sr., a former U.S. Marine who now owns a concrete construction business. She has a brother, Joe. She grew up between Middleburg and Jacksonville. She went to University Christian School before transferring to Samuel W. Wolfson High School when she was in tenth grade. She moved to Los Angeles at the age of 17 to pursue an acting career.

Career 

After taking commercial and acting class, she fell in love with acting and realized that she preferred it over modeling. Greene graduated from high school early and moved to Los Angeles to pursue an acting career.

Early in her career, she appeared as a guest on such television programs, as Punk'd and Crossing Jordan. Greene's big break came in 2008, when she was cast as Alice Cullen in The Twilight Saga series of films, based on the novel series of the same name by Stephenie Meyer. The series consists of the films Twilight, The Twilight Saga: New Moon, The Twilight Saga: Eclipse, The Twilight Saga: Breaking Dawn – Part 1, and The Twilight Saga: Breaking Dawn – Part 2, which were respectively released in 2008, 2009, 2010, 2011, and 2012.

Greene portrayed Michelle Burkham in the drama film Skateland, which premiered at the 2010 Sundance Film Festival.

She reunited with her Twilight co-star Kellan Lutz in the movie A Warrior's Heart (2011), and also starred in thriller film Summer's Blood (2009) and the Dark Castle Entertainment horror film The Apparition (2012).

In 2013, Greene starred in the historical film CBGB about the former Manhattan music club with the same name.

Personal life
Greene became engaged to Australian television personality Paul Khoury in December 2016. They were married on July 6, 2018 in San Jose, California. In March 2022, Greene announced that she and her husband were expecting their first child. Their daughter was born in September 2022.

Greene is a friend of her Twilight co-stars, Kellan Lutz and Jackson Rathbone, whom she knew before filming of the series began. She has stated that she grew up watching football and is a Florida Gators fan. She was also seen attending a Green Bay Packers game against the New York Giants with then-boyfriend Joe Jonas and Jessica Szohr at Lambeau Field in 2010. In 2009, nude self-portraits of Greene were leaked onto the internet. Her attorneys threatened to sue various websites that published the pictures.

Appearing nude in a bodypainted bikini, Greene posed for SoBe advertisements that ran in the 2010 issue of the Sports Illustrated Swimsuit Edition. In 2010, she received "The Style Icon Award" at Hollywood Lifes Young Hollywood Awards, as well as an award from People for the Ethical Treatment of Animals for representing Avon and their no testing on animals policy.

Filmography

Film

Television

Music video, video game, and web series

Awards and nominations

References

External links 

 

1987 births
Living people
21st-century American actresses
Actresses from Jacksonville, Florida
American film actresses
American television actresses
American video game actresses
American voice actresses
Lee Strasberg Theatre and Film Institute alumni
People from Middleburg, Florida
University Christian School alumni